Swordfish Studios Limited was a British video game developer based in Birmingham founded by Trevor Williams and Joan Finnegan (wife of Paul Finnegan, former managing director of Rage Software Limited) in September 2002.

Games developed by the company include two best selling International Rugby titles, including World Championship Rugby. Others include Brian Lara International Cricket 2005 and Cold Winter. In 2004, Swordfish Studios was named 'Developer of the Year' by The Independent Games Developers Association.

Swordfish Studios was acquired by Vivendi Universal Games in June 2005, becoming a fully owned studio of Sierra Entertainment.

On 12 November 2008, Swordfish's Manchester studio was sold to Monumental Games. Swordfish's Birmingham studio was acquired by Codemasters on 15 November 2008 after an agreement with Activision Blizzard. It is now known as Codemasters Birmingham. The studio closed down in 2010. Many of the former Swordfish Studios employees have been hired by Crytek UK.

Games developed

See also
Vivendi Games
Sierra Entertainment

References

External links

Former Activision subsidiaries
Sierra Entertainment
Codemasters
Video game companies established in 2002
Video game companies disestablished in 2010
Defunct companies based in Birmingham, West Midlands
Defunct video game companies of the United Kingdom
Video game development companies
2002 establishments in England
2010 disestablishments in England